Tímea Babos and Kristina Mladenovic won the women's doubles tennis title at the 2018 Australian Open, defeating Ekaterina Makarova and Elena Vesnina in the final, 6–4, 6–3. It was the first Grand Slam title for Babos, who became the first Hungarian player to win a Grand Slam event since Andrea Temesvári in the 1986 French Open and the second Grand Slam title for Mladenovic. 

Makarova and Vesnina were attempting to achieve the career Super Slam in doubles (would be third and fourth overall after Gigi Fernández and Pam Shriver).

Bethanie Mattek-Sands and Lucie Šafářová were the defending champions, but Mattek-Sands could not participate this year due to injury. Šafářová played alongside Barbora Strýcová, but lost in the quarterfinals to Hsieh Su-wei and Peng Shuai.

Seeds

Draw

Finals

Top half

Section 1

Section 2

Bottom half

Section 3

Section 4

References

External links
Draw
 2018 Australian Open – Women's draws and results at the International Tennis Federation

Women's Doubles
Australian Open (tennis) by year – Women's doubles
Australian Open – Women's Doubles
Australian Open – Women's Doubles
Australian Open – Women's Doubles